Chumpol Silpa-archa (6 June 1940 – 21 January 2013) was a Thai politician who served in the government of Thailand as Minister of Tourism and Sports from 2008 to 2013; he was also Deputy Prime Minister from 2011 to 2013. Beginning in January 2009, he was the president of the Chartthaipattana Party. He was the younger brother of Prime Minister Banharn Silpa-archa.

Early life 
Born at Suphanburi, Chumpol held a Bachelor of Laws from the Thammasat University and an MPA from the Syracuse University.

Political career 
He worked as a civil servant and political science lecturer at the Thammasat University, before he entered politics in 1979. A member of the conservative-populist Thai Nation Party, he represented Suphan Buri Province in parliament. In the following years he held different high-rank government positions. In 1986 and 1992, he was Vice President of the House of Representatives. From 1997 to 1998 he was Minister of Education in Chuan Leekpai's cabinet. As he was no member of the Thai Nation Party's executive board, he was, unlike his brother, not banned from political activity by the Constitutional Court's ruling of 2 December 2008. So he could, as his brother's proxy, become leader of the Chartthaipattana Party, which is the de facto successor of the dissolved Thai Nation Party. After his grouping broke the coalition with the People's Power Party and joined the Democrat-led government, Chumpol became Minister of Tourism and Sports under Prime Minister Abhisit Vejjajiva.

When the Pheu Thai Party led by Yingluck Shinawatra won the 2011 elections, Chumpol changed sides again, and directed his Chartthaipattana Party into the coalition with Pheu Thai. He kept the Tourism and Sports portfolio and was additionally appointed Deputy Prime Minister, on 9 August 2011.

Death
Chumpol died of heart failure on 21 January 2013, around 09:30 hours, at Ramathibodi Hospital, while holding the offices of Deputy Prime Minister and Minister of Tourism and Sports.

Royal Decorations
Chumpol Silpa-archa has been decorated with the Special Class of both the Order of the White Elephant and the Order of the Crown of Thailand.

References

1940 births
2013 deaths
Chumpol Silpa-archa
Chumpol Silpa-archa
Chumpol Silpa-archa
Syracuse University alumni
Chumpol Silpa-archa
Chumpol Silpa-archa
Chumpol Silpa-archa
Chumpol Silpa-archa
Chumpol Silpa-archa
Chumpol Silpa-archa
Chumpol Silpa-archa
Chumpol Silpa-archa